Edward Blore (1787–1879) was an English antiquarian, artist, and architect.  He was born in Derby, and was trained  by his father, Thomas, who was an antiquarian and a topographer.  Edward became skilled at drawing accurate and detailed architectural illustrations.  His commissions included drawings of Peterborough, Durham, and Winchester Cathedrals.  His drawings of Althorp brought him to the attention of Earl Spencer, who was influential in introducing him to other wealthy and influential patrons.  After his father died in 1818, Blore started to prepare architectural designs for new buildings.  The first of these was for the enlargement of Sir Walter Scott's Abbotsford House.  Although this was not accepted, it led to the acceptance of his design for Corehouse, a large country house in Lanarkshire, Scotland, for the judge George Cranstoun.  More commissions for country houses followed.  Blore then became involved with the Church Commissioners, designing, with others, a series of churches that have become to be known as Commissioners' churches, the first of these being St George's Church in Battersea, London.

Blore's connection with Earl Spencer helped him to gain the commission for rebuilding Lambeth Palace for the Archbishop of Canterbury.  Following this he worked on some of the most important buildings in the country, including the completion of Buckingham Palace, on Windsor Castle and on Hampton Court Palace.  He gained two commissions for major works abroad, the Vorontsov Palace in Ukraine, and Government House, Sydney in Sydney, Australia.  The rest of his works are in Great Britain, and mainly in England.  These range from palaces and country houses, cathedrals and churches, through schools, rectories, and lodges, to groups of estate houses with washhouses.

Blore received a DCL degree from Oxford University, and was a founder member of the British Archaeological Association and of the Institute of British Architects.  He retired from active architectural practice in 1849, but continued to produce drawings.  In total, these filled 48 volumes, which are held in the British Library.  Blore died at his home in Manchester Square, Marylebone, London, in 1879, leaving an estate of £80,000.

Key

Works

See also
List of works by Edward Blore on palaces and large houses
List of miscellaneous works by Edward Blore

References

Bibliography